The Coupe de France 1980–81 was its 64th edition. It was won by SC Bastia which defeated AS Saint-Étienne in the Final.

Round of 16

Quarter-finals

Semi-finals
First round

Second round

Final

References

French federation

1980–81 domestic association football cups
1980–81 in French football
1980-81